Joseph Hyman Lookstein (December 25, 1902 – July 13, 1979) was a Russian-born American rabbi who served as spiritual leader of Congregation Kehilath Jeshurun on the Upper East Side of Manhattan and was a leader in Orthodox Judaism, including his service as president of the Rabbinical Council of America and of the cross-denominational Synagogue Council of America and New York Board of Rabbis. He was President of Bar-Ilan University from 1957 to 1967.

Biography
Lookstein was born in Mogilev, Belarus, then in the Russian Empire, and after emigrating to the United States, attended City College of New York and did graduate work at Columbia University. He received his Jewish education at Rabbi Jacob Joseph School and received his rabbinic ordination in 1926 from the Rabbi Isaac Elchanan Theological Seminary at Yeshiva University. He had already served as an assistant for three years at Congregation Kehilath Jeshurun, assisting his grandfather-in-law Rabbi Moses S. Margolies, and continued in that role after receiving his ordination, assuming the title of senior rabbi after Margolies's death in 1936.

In 1930, he established the Hebrew Teachers Training School for Girls, now part of Yeshiva University, and served as its principal for ten years. Shortly after the establishment of Bar-Ilan University in Ramat Gan, Israel, Rabbi Lookstein became the institution's acting president in 1957 for nine years, succeeding Pinkhos Churgin, before being succeeded by Max Jammer and named as the school's chancellor in 1966. During his tenure, the school grew from a single building with 40 students into a school with an enrollment of thousands.

He was elected as head of the Synagogue Council of America in 1979, was a past president of the Rabbinical Council of America and the New York Board of Rabbis.

He founded the Ramaz School in 1937, which was named in honor of his grandfather-in-law. Lookstein's son, Rabbi Haskel Lookstein, was a member of the school's inaugural first grade class. By the time of his death, the school had an enrollment of 800 students.

He died at age 76 on July 13, 1979 at Mount Sinai Hospital in Miami Beach, Florida. His son, Haskel Lookstein, had served as the Assistant Rabbi at Congregation Kehillath Jeshurun starting in 1958, and assumed the title of Senior Rabbi upon his father's death.

References

1902 births
1979 deaths
American Orthodox rabbis
Orthodox rabbis from Russia
City College of New York alumni
Columbia University alumni
Emigrants from the Russian Empire to the United States
Rabbi Isaac Elchanan Theological Seminary semikhah recipients
Rabbi Jacob Joseph School alumni
Yeshiva University faculty
People from Mogilev
Presidents of universities in Israel
20th-century American rabbis